Top Model Norge, cycle 5 was the fifth cycle of Top Model Norge. The show began to air on television on September 16, 2013. For the first time, the show was filmed in Los Angeles. Siri Tollerod was the host, replacing Mona Grudt, and the other judges are Erik Asla, Swedish coach Jonas Hallberg and model scout Donna Ioanna.

The winner of the competition was 20-year-old Frida Børli Solaker from Valnesfjord. She received a contract with Women Management in Milan, a major campaign for Maybelline and a cover of Norwegian Elle.

Episode Summaries

Episode 1 
First aired September 16, 2013

Eliminated outside of panel: Amalie Raa, Malin Ludvigsen, Talita Trygsland & Tina-Marie Eliassen
First call-out: Frida Børli Solaker
Bottom two: Elise Finnanger & Lovise Helvig
Eliminated: Elise Finnanger

Episode 2
First aired September 23, 2013

Quit: Mariel Gomsrud & Marita Gomsrud
Re-entered: Amalie Raa & Malin Ludvigsen
First call-out: Amalie Henden
Bottom two: Malin Ludvigsen & Sunniva Veliz Pedersen
Eliminated: Sunniva Veliz Pedersen
Featured photographer: Marcel Leliënhof

Episode 3
First aired September 30, 2013

First call-out: Ayla Svenke	
Bottom two: Amalie Raa & Rachana Nekså	
Eliminated: Amalie Raa

Episode 4
First aired October 7, 2013

First call-out: Lovise Helvig	 
Bottom two: Celina Mørch Honningsvåg & Malin Ludvigsen	
Eliminated: Malin Ludvigsen

Episode 5
First aired October 14, 2013

First call-out: Kristina Hansen	 
Bottom two: Ayla Svenke & Celina Mørch Honningsvåg	 
Eliminated: Celina Mørch Honningsvåg

Episode 6
First aired October 21, 2013

First call-out: Ingebjørg Strand Lende	 
Bottom two: Ayla Svenke & Frida Børli Solaker	 
Eliminated: Ayla Svenke

Episode 7
First aired October 28, 2013

First call-out: Lovise Helvig	 
Bottom two: Amalie Henden & Ingebjørg Strand Lende	
Eliminated: Amalie Henden

Episode 8
First aired November 4, 2013

First call-out: Lovise Helvig	
Bottom two: Ine Ripsrud & Kristina Hansen	
Eliminated: Kristina Hansen

Episode 9
First aired November 11, 2013

First call-out: Rachana Nekså	
Bottom two: Ine Ripsrud & Marlen Fjeldstad	 
Eliminated: Marlen Fjeldstad

Episode 10
First aired November 18, 2013

First call-out: Ingebjørg Strand Lende	 
Bottom two: Frida Børli Solaker & Rachana Nekså	
Eliminated: Rachana Nekså

Episode 11
First aired November 25, 2013

Bottom two: Ine Ripsrud & Lovise Helvig	
Eliminated: Ine Ripsrud

Episode 12
First aired December 2, 2013

Eliminated: Lovise Helvig
Final two: Frida Børli Solaker & Ingebjørg Strand Lende	 
Norway's Next Top Model: Frida Børli Solaker

Contestants

Summaries

Call-out order

 The contestant was eliminated
 The contestant quit the competition
 The contestant won the competition

 In episode 2, Amalie R. and Malin, who were originally cut in the semi-finals, re-entered the competition as replacements for Mariel and Marita.
 In episode 12, Lovise was eliminated at LAX before the finalists traveled to New York City.

Photo Shoot Guide
Episode 1 Photo Shoot: Poolside Group Shot 
Episode 2 Photo Shoot: Posing Nude With Pythons
Episode 3 Photo Shoot: Jumping on a Trampoline for Moods of Norway
Episode 4 Photo Shoot: Prom Dresses in an Alley
Episode 5 Photo Shoot: Portraying Emotions During an Armageddon
Episode 6 Photo Shoot: Maybelline ads in a Pool in Pairs
Episode 7 Photo Shoot: Dominatrix in B&W with Big Cats
Episode 8 Photo Shoot: Schwarzkopf Gliss Shampoo Campaign
Episode 9 Photo Shoot: Los Angeles Starlets
Episode 10 Photo Shoot: Sexy, Cool and Trendy Women for Schwarzkopf
Episode 11 Photo Shoot: Elle Cover Tries
Episode 12 Photo Shoot: Glamorous Gowns Over the New York City Skyline

Judges
Siri Tollerød
Jonas Hallberg
Donna Ioanna
Erik Asla

External links
 Official website

References

Top Model Norge
2013 Norwegian television seasons
TV3 (Norway) original programming